is a 1987 radio drama written and directed by Mamoru Oshii. The music is composed and performed by Kenji Kawai.

It was released in 2000 as a limited CD drama bundled with Kerberos Panzer Cop: Complete Book [Zen] edition.

Kerberos saga

Kerberos

Primarily, the term kerberos is a reference to Hades' three-headed watchdog of hell in the Greek mythology. It is also used to designate the Panzer Cops.

Tachiguishi

As tachigui professionals, the legendary Fast Food Grifters have the privilege to eat in stand-and-eat street restaurants without paying.

Live-action film sequel (1987)

The Red Spectacles was released in Japanese theaters the following month.

Manga adaptation (1999)

The Fast Food Grifter assassination episode (立喰師撲殺事件) which led to both the Metropolitan Police's dismantlement order and the Kerberos Riot is portrayed in Kerberos Panzer Cop: Conclusion'''s Act 6.

Novel spin-off (2004)Tachiguishi-Retsuden was written by Mamoru Oshii in 2004. It extends the Tachigui arc introduced in While Waiting for the Red Spectacles.

Story
Chronicles

Kerberos saga historical background and significant dates in both the real and fictitious history.

Plot
The narration is about events happening to Koichi Todome while exiled from Japan after the Kerberos Riot, before Inui came to Taiwan seeking for him. The portrayed events can be localized in the saga's timeline between the prologue of The Red Spectacles and StrayDog.

In 1999, 3rd night: Story of the incident of Fast Food Grifter Cold Badger Masa's clubbing to death was adapted in comic to become Kerberos Panzer Cop Act 6.

Track listing
1st night: Kerberos Night - The Rise and Fall of the Panzer Detective(第一夜 ケルベロスの夜－機甲刑事の栄光と没落)
2nd night: Kerberos Night - Dog's name: "Koichi Todome"(第二夜 ケルベロスの夜－犬の名は都々目紅一)
3rd night: Tachiguishi Night - Story of the incident of Fast Food Grifter Cold Badger Masa's clubbing to death(第三夜 立食師たちの夜－マッハ軒立食師撲殺事件・異聞)
4th night: Tachiguishi Night - The Fast Food Grifter becoming a myth ?(第四夜 立食師たちの夜－師よ神話の人となるか)
5th night: Tachiguishi Night - Does the dog throw into the darkness of the battle and just leave ?(第五夜 立食師たちの夜－犬は戦いの闇に舞い降りるか)

Releases
The drama was broadcast on Radio Nihon in January 1987, one month before the release of The Red Spectacles. In September 2000, it was released as a CD drama bundled with the Kerberos Panzer Cop: Complete Book manga.

The two musical themes were released, in 2003, in Kenji Kawai's "Cinema Anthology" audio CD boxset.

Production
Cast
局員A: Akio Ōtsuka (大塚明夫)
局員B: Takashi Matsuyama (松山鷹志)
局員C: Rei Sakuma (佐久間レイ)
局員D: Mako Hyodo (兵藤まこ)
Airport announcer: Rei Sakuma (佐久間レイ)
Police radio A: Takashi Matsuyama (松山鷹志)
Police radio B: Haji Takaya (土師孝也)
Police radio C: Akio Ohtsuka (大塚明夫)
Narrator: Haji Takaya (土師孝也)

Staff
原案・脚本: Mamoru Oshii, (伊藤和典)
録音演出: (若林和弘)
調整: (門倉徹), (高野慎二)
音楽: (川井憲次)
監督: (押井守)
Recording studio: Tokyo TV Center
Original edition: Pair Pair Animage / Radio Japan
Broadcast: January 26~30 1987

External links
 Kenji Kawai's official website (Japanese/English'')

Japanese radio dramas
2000 albums
Kerberos saga